Bonza is a single-player crossword puzzle application developed by MiniMega, which was chosen by Apple to become part of the App Store's Best of 2014 list.

Gameplay
In Bonza, players are given fragments of a crossword puzzle and tasked with fitting them back together. There are no clues for each word, rather one clue for the puzzle setting its theme.

In 2016, the developers added a feature that allows players to create their own puzzles.

Reception 
Bonza was chosen by Apple as part of the App Store's Best of 2014 list. Bonza was described as a "game with a strangely erratic rhythm", but received praised for its value in providing 70 puzzles for less than a dollar.

References

2014 video games
Word games
Single-player video games
Crossword video games